Vale do Javari (English language: Javari Valley) is one of the largest indigenous territories in Brazil, encompassing 85,444.82 km2 (32,990 mi2) – an area larger than Austria. It is named after the Javari River, the most important river of the region, which since 1851 has formed the border with Peru. It includes much of the Atalaia do Norte municipality as well as adjacent territories in the western section of Amazonas state. Besides the Javari it is transected by the Pardo, Quixito, Itaquai and Ituí rivers.

Inhabitants
Vale do Javari is home to 3,000 indigenous peoples of Brazil with varying degrees of contact, including the Matis, the Matses, the Kulina, and others. The uncontacted indigenous peoples are estimated to be more than 2,000 individuals belonging to at least 14 tribes including the Isolados do Rio Quixito, Isolados do Itaquai (Korubo), Isolados do Jandiatuba, Isolados do Alto Jutai, Isolados do Sao Jose, Isolados do Rio Branco, Isolados do Medio Javari and Isolados do Jaquirana-Amburus. These are believed to be living deep inside its reservation areas. The uncontacted tribes live in some 19 known villages identified by air. According to Fabricio Amorim from Fundação Nacional do Índio, the region contains "the greatest concentration of isolated groups in the Amazon and the world".

The Brazilian government has made it illegal for non-indigenous people to enter the territory; the area (along with its inhabitants) is observed by the government from the air.

Illegal economic activities 
The region is known for being a trafficking route for cocaine. Illegal activities, like fishing (mostly to export pirarucu and piracatinga), logging and mining, help criminal groups linked to drug trafficking to launder money and import more drugs to Brazil.

In the media
In October 2009, a plane with eleven people aboard emergency-landed in the middle of the reservation. People from the Matis tribe found the wreckage and alerted local authorities, who dispatched a rescue mission that flew nine survivors out of the reservation.

Vale do Javari is the setting of the 2011 report The Unconquered: In Search of the Amazon's Last Uncontacted Tribes by National Geographic writer Scott Wallace. It details a 76-day expedition in 2002 led by Sydney Possuelo to find the status of the "Arrow People", an uncontacted tribe.

In June 2022, British freelance journalist Dom Phillips and Bruno Pereira, a Brazilian expert on indigenous peoples of Amazonas, were murdered for helping to protect indigenous people from illegal drug traffickers, miners, loggers, and hunters.

Notes

External links
 Unknown Tribes of Javari Valley

Indigenous Territories (Brazil)
Indigenous topics of the Amazon
Uncontacted peoples